The Fire Inside is the debut studio album by British singer-songwriter Luke Sital-Singh. It was released on 18 August 2014 and peaked at number 43 in the UK Official Charts

Track listing

References

2014 debut albums